Munsel is a surname. Notable people with the surname include:

Patrice Munsel (1925–2016), American coloratura soprano
Matthew Munsel Howard (1794–1879), Canadian miller, farmer, and political figure

Munsel in Tibetan means “Eliminator of Darkness.” Used in spiritual names in Buddhism

See also
Munsell (disambiguation)